Jeanne d'Arc FC is a Malian football club based in Bamako.

History
They will play in the 2008–09 Malian Première Division, the top division in Malian football. They are owned by former supporters of the Bamako club Stade Malien.

Creation
At the end of the 2006–07 season, a group of Stade supporters broke away to form their own football club, taking the "Jeanne d'Arc" name with them. The name is a reference to one of two defunct clubs which combined to form Stade Malien, Jeanne d'Arc du Soudan (founded 1938) in 1960. In late 2007 this group formed Jeanne d'Arc FC Bamako, which competed in lower division football during the 2007–08 season.

Promotion
In September 2008, Jeanne d'Arc became champions of the Malian Groupe B league soccer tournament, one of two regional tournaments which promotes teams to the Malien Première Division, and will compete against their former counterparts during the 2008–09 season.

Achievements
Malian Groupe B League: 1
2008

References

Bamako
Sport in Bamako
Association football clubs established in 2007
Fan-owned football clubs
2007 establishments in Mali